Gabriel "Gabi" Munteanu (born 25 June 1973 in Poienești, Vaslui) is a Romanian judoka.

Achievements

References
 
 

1973 births
Living people
Romanian male judoka
Judoka at the 2000 Summer Olympics
Judoka at the 2004 Summer Olympics
Olympic judoka of Romania
Sportspeople from Vaslui